Christopher Alan Crocker (born March 9, 1980) is an American football coach and former safety. He was drafted by the Cleveland Browns in the third round of the 2003 NFL Draft. He played college football at Marshall.

Crocker also played for the Atlanta Falcons, Miami Dolphins, Cincinnati Bengals, and Minnesota Vikings.

Crocker worked with the Atlanta Legends of the now-defunct Alliance of American Football. In June 2019, he was hired as a member of the St. Louis BattleHawks coaching staff in the upcoming XFL.

College career

Crocker played college football for Marshall. While there he was All-Mid-American Conference first-team in 2001 and second-team in 2002. He was second on the team in tackles as a senior with 126 stops and broke up ten passes. He was third on the Herd with 88 tackles in 2001 and led the team with 10 passes broken up.

He helped Marshall win MAC titles in 1999, 2000 and 2002. He also helped lead Marshall to bowl victories in 1999, 2000, 2001 and 2002.

Professional career

Cleveland Browns
Crocker was drafted in the third round, 84th overall, in 2003 by the Cleveland Browns, where he played from 2003-2005. In three seasons with the Browns he made 172 tackles, three interceptions, and four sacks.

Atlanta Falcons
Before the 2006 season, he was traded to the Atlanta Falcons for a fourth round draft pick in the 2006 NFL Draft. In two seasons with the Falcons he totaled 105 tackles, four interceptions, and two sacks.

Miami Dolphins
On March 29, 2008 the Miami Dolphins signed Crocker to a one-year $1.151 million contract with $300,000 guaranteed. He spent the first seven weeks of the 2008 season with the Dolphins, appearing in six games (two starts) and recording 10 tackles and a pass deflection. He was released on October 21 when the team re-signed safety Tyrone Culver.

Cincinnati Bengals
Crocker signed with the Cincinnati Bengals on October 30, 2008, for the final half on the 2008 season. He signed a new four-year contract with the Bengals worth $10 million on February 27, 2009. He was released on April 6, 2012. Crocker was re-signed by the Bengals on September 27.

Minnesota Vikings
The Minnesota Vikings signed with Crocker on August 4, 2014. Head Coach Mike Zimmer had worked with Crocker for 7 years in Atlanta and Cincinnati.

Coaching career
In 2019, Crocker worked with the Atlanta Legends of the Alliance of American Football. In June 2019, he was hired as a member of the St. Louis BattleHawks coaching staff in the upcoming XFL as a defensive assistant.

References

External links
 Marshall bio
 Cincinnati Bengals bio

1980 births
Living people
Sportspeople from Chesapeake, Virginia
Players of American football from Virginia
American football cornerbacks
American football safeties
Marshall Thundering Herd football players
Cleveland Browns players
Atlanta Falcons players
Miami Dolphins players
Cincinnati Bengals players
Minnesota Vikings players
Atlanta Legends coaches
St. Louis BattleHawks coaches